Frederick Andrews (10 July 1905 – 10 August 1983) was a New Zealand cricketer. He played first-class cricket for Auckland and Wellington between 1935 and 1943.

See also
 List of Auckland representative cricketers

References

External links
 

1905 births
1983 deaths
New Zealand cricketers
Auckland cricketers
Wellington cricketers
North Island Army cricketers